Can't Go Home Again is an album by Big Brother and the Holding Company, released in 1997.

Track listing
"Don't You Call Me Cryin'" (Lane Tietgen)
"I Know" (Barbara George)
"As the Years Go Passing By" (Deadric Malone)
"Three Times Last Week" (Dave Getz, Kathi McDonald, Sam Andrew)
"Heartache" (Traditional; arranged by Dave Getz, Kathi McDonald, Michael Pendergrass and Roy Schmall)
"Tired of It All" (Ted Ashford)
"I Can't Go Home Again" (Gary Wright, Kristina Uppstrom)
"Machine Song"
"Havana Ghila"
"Try It"
"Drivin' Stupid"
"Ghost Riders in the Sky"
"Ghost Riders (Reprise)"

Personnel
Big Brother and the Holding Company
 Kathi McDonald - vocals
 Dave Shallock - guitars, vocals
 Peter Albin - guitars, bass
 James Gurley - bass
 Dave Getz - drums, piano

Production
Michael Zagaris - photography

References

Big Brother and the Holding Company albums
1997 live albums